Dalal Ghazi Muhammad Abu Amneh (born; 1983 دلال غازي محمد أبو آمنة)  is a Palestinian singer and producer and a research doctor in brain sciences and neurophysiology from the Technion Applied Institute in Haifa. In 2022, she declined an invitation to perform at the Dubai Expo on the UAE's relations with Israel.

Career 
Amneh was born in 1983 in the city of Nazareth in the north of Israel.

Dalal started singing at the age of four, where she participated in the Spring Princess competition and won the title for the song "Maryam Maryamti" in 1987. At the age of sixteen, she was known for her elaborate performance of authentic songs and old roles, in addition to her performance of songs of Palestinian and Shami heritage. The great musicians of the Arab world, such as Salah Al-Sharnoubi and Assala, witnessed her and praised her voice, which in their opinion combines authenticity and modernity.

She is known for presenting committed human art and works to develop Palestinian art so that it preserves its originality on the one hand and simulates the young generation and the Western listener on the other hand, as a means of consolidating the Palestinian identity and supporting the causes of the Palestinian people. Dalal participated in important international and Arab festivals, such as the Jerash Festival and the Arab Music Festival at the Egyptian Opera House. She represented Palestine in several Arab operettas, such as the Land of the Prophets operetta 2012 and the Freedom Call operetta 2014. She also participates permanently in cultural and artistic evenings locally, Arably and internationally. In addition to her participation in her own band, Dalal is the lead singer in the international orchestra MESTO, through which she presents songs of Arab and Palestinian heritage, accompanied by Western musicians, with orchestral arrangements all over the world.

Dalal released several songs that gained wide popularity, such as "I am my heart and my soul is your sacrifice" in 2001, the words of Adnan Abbasi, composed by the artist Alaa Azzam, distributed by Habib Shehadeh, and recorded at Karem Matar Khalini Fei Balak Studios in 2003, and released two albums: "Karim Ya Ramadan" "2007", And the album "On My Country" 2013, an album that talks about Palestine in its various aspects and in a variety of lyrical styles. One of its songs was "Ain Al-Majra", which was on the list of the most successful songs on the radio, and the song "Bakrah Jadeed", which was among the five selected songs at the Euromed International Festival 2006.

Honors and awards 
Dalal Abu Amna, was honored in dozens of festivals in Palestine and the Arab world for her role in supporting humanitarian causes.

Contribute to preserving the artistic heritage in the Arab world, at the Festival of the Arab States Broadcasting Union in Tunisia, 2015.

A model Palestinian woman at the Palestinian Festival in Houston, 2015.

Best Artistic Personality in Palestine by the Lady of the Land Foundation, 2016.

The best female figures in Palestine by the Palestinian Ministry of Culture, 2017.

Songs

References

1983 births
Israeli Muslims
Palestinian women singers
People from Nazareth
Living people
Palestinian singers
Palestinian poets